The Deputy Commander-in-Chief of Defence Services is the second highest military rank in the Tatmadaw, the armed forces of Myanmar. The Deputy Commander-in-Chief is appointed by the President, in consultation with the National Defence and Security Council, of which they are also a member. The Deputy Commander-in-Chief also traditionally serves as army commander-in-chief.

List

See also
 Commander-in-Chief of Defence Services

References

Military ranks of Myanmar
Military of Myanmar